Lily Braun (2 July 1865 – 8 August 1916), born Amalie von Kretschmann, was a German feminist writer and politician of the Social Democratic Party (SPD).

Life 

Her maternal grandmother, the writer Jenny von Gustedt (1811–1890), was an illegitimate daughter of Jérôme Bonaparte, Napoleon's brother who was King of Westphalia, and his mistress Diana Rabe von Pappenheim. Lily Braun's great-niece, Marianne von Kretschmann, married Richard von Weizsäcker, President of Germany from 1984 to 1994.

Raised according to the Prussian virtues of order and discipline at changing places throughout her father's military career, she nevertheless developed a direct and open personality, encouraged in particular by her grandmother . She was considered to be highly ambitious, and her family provided her with a broad education by numerous private teachers. From an early age on, she began to question her parents' bourgeois values as influenced by Lutheranism and Calvinism as well the position of women in Prussian society. When her father retired in 1890, she had to establish a sustainable livelihood herself.

Together with him she was involved in the ethical movement, which sought to establish a system of morality in place of the traditional religions. Also, she became concerned with the ideas of socialism and the feminist movement, working as a journalist for the feminist newspaper  (The Women's Movement) issued by Minna Cauer.

After her first husband's death, she married in 1896 Heinrich Braun, who was a Social Democratic politician and a publicist. The couple had one son, a highly talented poet who was killed at the Western Front in the last months of World War I.

Lily Braun joined the SPD at an early age and became one of the leaders of the German feminist movement. Within the party, she belonged to the revisionist opposition within the SPD, which did not believe in the theories of historical materialism, but aimed for a gradual change in society, rather than a socialist revolution. Her attempts to mediate between proletarian and bourgeois feminist circles were heavily criticised; likewise, her proposals on reconciliation of family and working life were rejected. Her answers to the woman question were especially slammed by socialist authors like Clara Zetkin, while middle-class circles considered her ideas too radical.

Like her fellow political activist Helene Stöcker, Lily Braun was strongly influenced by Friedrich Nietzsche; she and her husband wanted the SPD to focus on the development of personality and individuality instead of levelling everybody. Women should have their own personality and should not have to be only regarded as (future) mothers and wives. She wanted economic freedom for women and advocated new types of personal relations up to the abolition of legal marriage.

Deeply concerned about the fate of her son, Lily Braun died in Zehlendorf (today part of Berlin) from the consequences of a stroke at the age of 51, in the midst of World War I. After her death, her second husband Heinrich Braun married Julie Braun-Vogelstein, who was also the editor of Lily Braun's Collected Works.

Works 
 Die Frauenfrage: Ihre geschichtliche Entwicklung und ihre wirtschaftliche Seite  (The Women's Question: historical development and economic aspect) (1901)
Wahrheit oder Legende: Ein Wort zu den Kriegsbriefen des Generals von Kretschman (Truth or Legend: A word on the war letters of General von Kretschmar) 
 Die Mutterschaftsversicherung: Ein Beitrag zur Frage der Fürsorge für Schwangere und Wöchnerinnen  (Maternity Insurance: an article on the question of care for pregnant women and those in childbed)
Die Frauen und die Politik  (Women and Politics)
Memoiren einer Sozialistin - Lehrjahre (Memoirs of a Socialist - Apprenticeship years) (Novel)
Memoiren einer Sozialistin - Kampfjahre (Memoirs of a Woman Socialist – Years of Struggle) (Novel) 
 Mutterschaft: Ein Sammelwerk für die Probleme des Weibes als Mutter (Motherhood: A collection of works on the problems of women as mothers)
Die Liebesbriefe der Marquise (The Marchioness's Loveletters)
Die Frauen und der Krieg (Women and the War)
Im Schatten der Titanen: Erinnerungen an Baronin Jenny von Sustedt  (In the Shadow of the Titans: Recollections of Baroness Jenny von Sustedt) (1908) - a biography of Braun's grandmother; the "Titans" of the title were Napoleon Bonaparte, who was von Sustedt's uncle, and Goethe, with whom she came in contact in her Weimar childhood.
Lebenssucher (Searchers for Life)
Frauenarbeit und Beruf (Women's Work and Career)

External links

References

1865 births
1916 deaths
19th-century German people
19th-century German writers
Social Democratic Party of Germany politicians
German religious humanists
Feminist writers
Feminism and history
Prussian nobility
People from the Province of Saxony
People from Halberstadt
German socialist feminists
19th-century German women writers
German people of French descent
German people of Italian descent